The West Highland Line ( - "Iron Road to the Isles") is a railway line linking the ports of Mallaig and Oban in the Scottish Highlands to Glasgow in Central Scotland. The line was voted the top rail journey in the world by readers of independent travel magazine Wanderlust in 2009, ahead of the notable Trans-Siberian line in Russia and the Cuzco to Machu Picchu line in Peru. The ScotRail website has since reported that the line has been voted the most scenic railway line in the world for the second year running.

The West Highland Line is one of two railway lines that access the remote and mountainous west coast of Scotland, the other being the Kyle of Lochalsh Line which connects Inverness with Kyle of Lochalsh. The line is the westernmost railway line in Great Britain.

At least in part, the West Highland Line is the same railway line as that referred to as the West Highland Railway.

History

The route was built in several sections:
Glasgow Queen Street to Cowlairs Junction - Edinburgh and Glasgow Railway
Cowlairs Junction to Bowling - Glasgow, Dumbarton and Helensburgh Railway (later absorbed into the Edinburgh and Glasgow Railway)
Bowling to Dumbarton Central - Lanarkshire and Dunbartonshire Railway, operated by the Caledonian Railway
Dumbarton Central to Dalreoch - Caledonian and Dunbartonshire Junction Railway
Dalreoch to Craigendoran - Glasgow, Dumbarton and Helensburgh Railway
Craigendoran to Fort William (opened 11 August 1894) - West Highland Railway sponsored by the North British Railway
Crianlarich to Oban - Callander and Oban Railway, operated by the Caledonian Railway.

There is an additional section from Fort William (or a junction near Fort William) to Mallaig, built as the Mallaig Extension Railway. The West Highland Railway approved the construction of the line at their annual meeting in January 1895.

The line faced potential closure as part of the Beeching cuts in 1963 and again in 1995 due to reduced revenues.

Route description

Shortly after leaving Glasgow Queen Street station, and beyond Queen Street Tunnel, the line diverges from the main trunk route to Edinburgh and Perth at Cowlairs and follows a northwesterly course through the suburbs of Maryhill and Kelvindale. Between  and Dumbarton, the route is shared with the North Clyde Line to Helensburgh before branching northward at Craigendoran Junction towards , the section where the West Highland Line itself is generally accepted to begin. It gives high-level views of the Gareloch and Loch Long before emerging alongside the northwesterly shores of Loch Lomond, then climbs Glen Falloch to Crianlarich. 

About  from Crianlarich, the Mallaig and Oban routes both pass through the village of Tyndrum, but they are served by separate stations, making it the smallest settlement in the UK to be served by more than one railway station.

After Bridge of Orchy, the line to Mallaig climbs onto Rannoch Moor, past the former crossing point at Gorton Crossing to  station. In winter, the moor is often covered with snow, and deer may be seen running from the approaching train. This is the summit of the line at 1347 ft (410 m) above sea level. Carrying on northwards, the line descends above the shores of Loch Treig and through the narrow Monessie Gorge. The section between Fort William and Mallaig passes over the Glenfinnan Viaduct, through Arisaig with its views of the Small Isles of Rùm, Eigg, Muck and Canna, and the white sands of Morar before coming to Mallaig itself.

With the exception of the route between Glasgow Queen Street and Helensburgh Upper, and the short section between Fort William Junction and Fort William station, the railway is signalled using the Radio Electronic Token Block, controlled from the signal box at Banavie station.

Services
Passenger services on the line are operated by ScotRail and Caledonian Sleeper. As of May 2021, the service pattern is as follows:

 3tpd each way Mallaig - Glasgow Queen Street
 1tpd each way Mallaig - Fort William
 1tpd Oban - Dalmally
 6tpd each way Oban - Glasgow Queen Street. Additionally, 1tpd Glasgow Queen Street - Oban (one way only)

Four of the services from Glasgow Queen Street - Mallaig are combined with services to Oban, splitting at Crianlarich. Similarly, two of the return services combine at Crianlarich.

During the summer season from May until October a steam locomotive-hauled daily return service between Fort William and Mallaig known as The Jacobite is operated by West Coast Railways. There is one train a day in May, September and October, and two trains per day from June until the end of August.

Caledonian Sleeper operates a nightly service from Fort William to London Euston.

Onward ferry connections operated by Caledonian MacBrayne are available from Mallaig to the Isle of Skye, to the small isles of Rùm, Eigg, Muck, and Canna, to South Uist, and to Inverie on the Knoydart peninsula. From Oban ferries sail to the islands of Lismore, Colonsay, Coll, Tiree, Mull and Barra.

As of 2021, there is a single regular freight operation on the line, consisting of alumina services from North Blyth to a smelter near Fort William.

Route timings
Since improvements to Scottish trunk roads in the 1980s, a train journey can take significantly longer than the equivalent road journey. There are several reasons for this. A further issue is finding suitable timetable paths for Oban & Mallaig trains on the busy North Clyde line, which carries an intensive local stopping service. As West Highland trains only stop at Dumbarton Central and Dalmuir on this stretch, it is not uncommon for them be delayed by a preceding local train and so recovery time has to be included in their schedules to reduce the possibility of a late arrival in Glasgow. 

The Caledonian Sleeper travels at  maximum, slowing down for a number of bridges on the route due to the heavy weight of the Class 67 locomotive which hauled the train until the end of the old franchise in April 2015. The operator of the sleeper Serco has replaced these with refurbished Class 73/9 electro-diesels since it took over, which have a lighter axle load; it isn't yet clear if the new locos will be cleared to run at higher speeds now they are in service.

Rolling stock 

In early 2018 it was widely reported that Class 158s would be used from Q3-Q4 2018 to replace the Class 156s. However, following investigation it was discovered that the line does not have sufficient gauge clearance for the class.  studies were still ongoing.

Some notable railway-related features
 The Horse Shoe Curve, between Upper Tyndrum and Bridge of Orchy
 The Cruach Rock snowshed, between Rannoch and Corrour
 Glenfinnan Viaduct, between Locheilside and Glenfinnan
 The Pass of Brander stone signals, between Dalmally and Taynuilt
 Arisaig is the furthest west railway station in Great Britain.

The two branches of the line are described in detail by John Thomas in his two books (see Sources).

The route in detail

Places served along the route from Glasgow Queen Street are listed below. Sleeper services to Fort William start, however, at London Euston, calling at Edinburgh Waverley and Queen Street Low Level (to pick up or set down depending on direction).

West Highland Line in film 
 Glenfinnan Viaduct, on the line between Fort William and Mallaig, is a filming location for the Hogwarts Express in the Harry Potter series of films.
 Eddie McConnell's poetic documentary A Line for All Seasons (1970) showcases the line and its history set against the scenery of the western highlands as it changes through the seasons.
 Corrour station features in Trainspotting (1996), directed by Danny Boyle.

Museum
There is a museum dedicated to the history of the West Highland Line situated at Glenfinnan Station.

Future 
In the Scottish Government's National Transport Strategy, published in February 2020, it was stated that the line will not be electrified with overhead lines. Instead, an alternative to diesel traction will be found.

Gallery

Notes

References

Footnotes

Sources

Further reading

External links

 Video of entire journey from Glasgow Queen Street over Fort William to Mallaig: filmed from the cab of the train.
Video footage of Garelochhead railway station
Lochailort railway station

Transport in Argyll and Bute
Transport in Highland (council area)
Railway lines in Scotland
Standard gauge railways in Scotland